Rachel Georgia Wehl Lowe (born 19 November 2000) is an Australian soccer player who plays as a forward or midfielder for Sydney FC in A-League Women and internationally for the Australia national team. She previously played for the Western Sydney Wanderers in Australia and UCLA Bruins in US college soccer. She made her debut for Australia in 2018 against China.

Early life and education
Born in Sydney, Lowe grew up in the Inner West and Northern Sydney. She started her football career with West Pymble FC, playing in a mixed team alongside her twin brother, Edward, before joining Northern Tigers FC in 2011. After three seasons with Tigers, she joined the Football New South Wales Institute (FNSWI) program, where she was coached by notable coaches such as Leah Blayney and Craig Foster. She attended Pymbles Ladies' College. A natural sporting talent, Lowe also played girls cricket at State and National level, and for Gordon District Cricket Club.

Playing career

College career
Lowe committed to UCLA in 2018 and joined the Bruins in 2019. On 23 August 2019, she made her collegiate debut in a 3–0 victory against Iowa State, scoring her first goal in the 58th minute. Lowe chose not to return to the Bruins in 2020.

Club career
From 2016 to 2018, Lowe played for the Football New South Wales Institute (FNSWI) program in the NPL NSW, and scored 19 goals in 42 appearances for the side.

Western Sydney Wanderers (2016–2019)
At age 15, Lowe signed with the Western Sydney Wanderers for the 2016–17 season and made her debut in Round 2 against Sydney FC. She made a total of 9 appearances for the club in her first season. In September 2017, she re-signed with the Wanderers. She finished the 2017–18 season with 1 goal in 8 appearances. In September 2018, Lowe re-signed for a third season with the club. She finished the 2018–19 season with 1 goal in 10 appearances.

International career
Lowe was called up to represent Australia at the 2017 AFC U-19 Women's Championship, where she scored in a 5–2 victory against Vietnam, helping her side progress to the semi-finals. She made 5 appearances for Australia U20 at the 2018 AFF Women's Championship, scoring once against Timor-Leste.

In February 2018, Lowe received her first call up to the senior team for the 2018 Algarve Cup in Portugal. She made her senior debut on 5 March 2018, coming on as a substitute in a 2–0 victory over China.

References

Australian women's soccer players
Western Sydney Wanderers FC (A-League Women) players
2000 births
Living people
Australian twins
Women's association football forwards
Women's association football midfielders
UCLA Bruins women's soccer players
Twin sportspeople
Australian expatriate sportspeople in the United States
Australian expatriate women's soccer players
Expatriate women's soccer players in the United States